Jeffrey Robin Chandler (born June 18, 1979) is an American former college and professional football player who was a placekicker in the National Football League (NFL) for three seasons during the early 2000s.  Chandler played college football for the University of Florida, where he became the all-time leading scorer with 368 points.  Thereafter, he played professionally for the San Francisco 49ers, Carolina Panthers and Washington Redskins of the NFL.

Early years 

Chandler was born in Jacksonville, Florida.  He attended Mandarin High School in Jacksonville, where he played kicker and wide receiver for the Mandarin Mustangs high school football team.  Chandler was also a standout letterman in soccer and tennis.

College career 

Chandler attended the University of Florida in Gainesville, Florida, where he joined coach Steve Spurrier's Florida Gators football program as a walk-on in 1997, kicking one extra point and later being granted a redshirt for the remainder of the 1997 season.  He subsequently played for the Gators from 1998 to 2001, and was rewarded with an athletic scholarship after the 1998 season.  He successfully completed sixty-seven of eighty field goal attempts in his career, and 167 of 180 attempted extra points after touchdowns (PATs).

Chandler was the Gators' all-time career leader in field goals completed, first in PATs made, and second in field goal percentage (83.8 percent).  He ranks second in Southeastern Conference (SEC) history in scoring with 368 points, fourth in league history in field goals made and second in field goal percentage.  He kicked his career long field goal of fifty-four yards in the Gators' 34–23 victory of the rival Georgia Bulldogs on October 28, 2000.

Chandler was a semifinalist for the Lou Groza Award honoring the nation's top collegiate placekicker in 1999 and 2000; was a second-team All-American in 1999; a first-team All-SEC selection in 1999 and 2001; and was chosen by his teammates as the Gators' most valuable player for the 1999 season.  He graduated from the University of Florida with a bachelor's degree in telecommunications in December 2001.

Professional career 

Chandler was released by the 49ers after the 2003 season, and he appeared on the regular season roster of two different teams in : the Carolina Panthers and the Washington Redskins. He played in thirteen games during his four-year NFL career, kicking nineteen field goals on twenty-seven attempts (70.4 percent), with a career long of forty-nine yards.

See also 

 Florida Gators
 Florida Gators football, 1990–99
 List of Carolina Panthers players
 List of Florida Gators football All-Americans
 List of Florida Gators in the NFL Draft
 List of University of Florida alumni
 List of Washington Redskins players

References

Bibliography 

 Carlson, Norm, University of Florida Football Vault: The History of the Florida Gators, Whitman Publishing, LLC, Atlanta, Georgia (2007).  .
 Golenbock, Peter, Go Gators!  An Oral History of Florida's Pursuit of Gridiron Glory, Legends Publishing, LLC, St. Petersburg, Florida (2002).  .
 Hairston, Jack, Tales from the Gator Swamp: A Collection of the Greatest Gator Stories Ever Told, Sports Publishing, LLC, Champaign, Illinois (2002).  .

External links 
  Jeff Chandler – Florida Gators player profile
  Jeff Chandler – National Football League player profile

1979 births
Living people
American football placekickers
Carolina Panthers players
Cleveland Browns players
Florida Gators football players
Jacksonville Jaguars players
Players of American football from Jacksonville, Florida
San Francisco 49ers players
Mandarin High School alumni
St. Louis Rams players
Washington Redskins players